Hiromoto (written: 弘元, 広元 or 博元) is a masculine Japanese given name. Notable people with the name include:

, Japanese samurai
, Japanese court noble
, Japanese baseball player

Japanese masculine given names